Sulphurous Lake is a freshwater body in the Cariboo Region of British Columbia, generally considered to be part of the Interlakes area as it is near Deka Lake. The lake has only one boat launch, which is now listed as an official recreation site.

Recreation & Community
The lake is the location of the Sulphurous Lake Resort. The Sulphurous Lake Volunteer Fire Department provides fire protection for the cabin community on the north shore of the lake. The fire department hosts an annual fishing derby on the lake. Much of the lake's eastern reach is surrounded by Rainbow/Q'iwentem Provincial Park. A recreation site is now open at the lake's boat launch.

Fishing
The lake is stocked with Rainbow Trout and Kokanee. Lake trout daily quota is 1 per person. Lake trout are released from October 1-November 30.

History

There was previously a garbage dump located north of the lake on Petty John Road, which is still clearly visible although being reclaimed by nature. The origin of the name of the lake is currently unknown.

References

Landforms of the Cariboo
Lakes of British Columbia